T.A. Peterman, short for Theodore Alfred "Al" Peterman, was the founder of Peterbilt Motors Company.

Born on March 22, 1893, Peterman was in the logging business in the West Coast of the US, where he modified and improved several used trucks for hauling jobs. In 1939, he acquired Fageol Truck and Coach Company of Oakland, California, from Sterling Motor Truck Co. The first Peterbilt trucks were nearly identical in appearance to the former Fageol designs.

Peterman died of cancer on November 16, 1944, in Tacoma, Washington, at the age of 51.

References

1944 deaths
1893 births
American chief executives in the automobile industry
American manufacturing businesspeople

20th-century American businesspeople
Deaths from cancer in Washington (state)